Lipsana insulaepaschalis is a species of ulidiid or picture-winged fly in the genus Lipsana of the family Ulidiidae.

References

Ulidiidae